Lovewell is an unincorporated community in Jewell County, Kansas, United States.

History
Previously known as Lovewell Station.

Education
The community is served by Rock Hills USD 107 public school district.

References

Further reading

External links
 Jewell County maps: Current, Historic, KDOT

Unincorporated communities in Jewell County, Kansas
Unincorporated communities in Kansas